The Callide Dam is an earth and rock-fill dam which was constructed in 1965 to supply water for the Callide Power Station in Mount Murchison near Biloela in the state of Queensland, Australia.

History 
In 1988, gates were added to the spillway to increase the capacity of the dam in 1988. SunWater, the water supply and services company, has undertaken a multi-station upgrade program to ensure highest levels of safety for dams of their responsibility. The Callide spillway was scheduled to be upgraded in the 'medium-term' range from 2008. In 2021, the spillway gates were to be removed and serviced to address vibration during their operation. 

In February 2015, the radial spillway gates on the dam automatically opened as a result of heavy rain from Tropical Cyclone Marcia. Severe flooding resulted downstream from the dam. In May 2015, a class action lawsuit against the dam operator SunWater was launched by residents affected by the flooding. The class action was dropped in February 2016.

The dam's highest recorded level was 102.37% of capacity in March 2017 as a result of heavy rains from ex Tropical Cyclone Debbie.

Fishing
A Stocked Impoundment Permit is required to fish in the dam.

See also

List of dams and reservoirs in Australia

References

Reservoirs in Queensland
Dams completed in 1965
Buildings and structures in Central Queensland
Dams in Queensland